The Serpent's Kiss is a 1997 British romantic drama film directed by Philippe Rousselot. Set in late-17th-century England, it tells the story of a Dutch garden architect, Meneer Chrome (Ewan McGregor), who has been hired by a wealthy merchant (Pete Postlethwaite) to create an extravagant garden. The film also stars Greta Scacchi and Richard E. Grant.

The film was entered into the 1997 Cannes Film Festival. To date, it is the only feature directed by Rousselot, an award-winning cinematographer.

Plot
Thomas Smithers (Postlethwaite), who has made his fortune as an ironmonger and cannon-maker, hires the famous Meneer Chrome (McGregor) to create the most extravagant garden imaginable on his overgrown property. Smithers doesn't know that his wife's cousin Fitzmaurice (Grant) has already hired Chrome, with the goal of bankrupting Smithers and essentially acquiring Juliana, whom he loves. Juliana, however, is attracted to Chrome and he in turn to the Smithers' daughter, Anna, who filters all experiences through a volume of Andrew Marvell's poems that she is never without. Her parents, thinking her mentally unstable, subject her to numerous "treatments" that prompt Chrome's compassion.

As the garden grows increasingly complex and Smithers approaches bankruptcy, Fitzmaurice realizes that Chrome's affection for Anna makes  him a liability; he threatens to reveal some damaging information about Chrome and then decides to kill him, but his plan backfires and Fitzmaurice dies. Juliana decides to remain loyal to her husband, now bankrupt from his obsession with the garden project. Chrome, revealed as an imposter (the assistant to the actual Chrome), goes to the sea with Anna, where she throws away her book of poetry.

Cast
 Ewan McGregor as Meneer Chrome
 Greta Scacchi as Juliana
 Pete Postlethwaite as Thomas Smithers
 Richard E. Grant as James Fitzmaurice
 Carmen Chaplin as Thea / Anna
 Donal McCann as Physician
 Charley Boorman as Secretary
 Gerard McSorley as Mr. Galmoy
 Britta Smith as Mrs. Galmoy
 Susan Fitzgerald as Mistress Clevely
 Pat Laffan as Pritchard
 Rúaidhrí Conroy as Physician's Assistant
 Henry King as Lead Reaper

Locations
Most of the film was shot in the County Clare village of Sixmilebridge in Mount Ievers court, the Republic of Ireland.

Legacy
This film marks the start of Charley Boorman and Ewan McGregor's long running friendship that would eventually lead to their trip around the world: Long Way Round and is referenced in the documentary.

References

External links
 
 
 

1997 films
Films directed by Philippe Rousselot
Films scored by Goran Bregović
Films set in the 17th century
British historical drama films
1990s historical drama films
1997 directorial debut films
1990s English-language films
1990s British films